= Centre for Tourism and Cultural Change =

International research centre

Centre for Tourism and Cultural Change (CTCC) is an international centre for critical research relating to the relationships between tourism, tourists and culture based at Leeds Metropolitan University, England. The CTCC engages in pure and applied research, postgraduate education and professional development, consultancy, publications and conference organisation. In addition, the CTCC works to maximise the potential of tourism to promote and support cultural diversity, stimulate intercultural dialogue and contribute to the achievement of the United Nations Millennium Development Goals, while maintaining a critical and creative approach.
